Aerenica is a monotypic beetle genus in the family Cerambycidae, erected by Pierre François Marie Auguste Dejean in 1835. Its only species, Aerenica canescens, was described by Johann Christoph Friedrich Klug in 1825.

References

Aerenicini
Beetles described in 1825
Monotypic Cerambycidae genera